Princess Helena of Denmark ( – 22 November 1233 in Lüneburg) was heiress of Garding and Duchess consort of Lüneburg.

Helena was daughter of Valdemar I of Denmark and Sophia of Minsk and sister of Ingeborg of Denmark, Queen of France.

In the summer of 1202 in Hamburg, Helena married Duke William of Lüneburg. Helena and William had a son, the future Duke, Otto I, The Child. After the early death of her husband, Duke William, in 1213, his brother, Emperor Otto IV, took over the reign of Lüneburg, as regent for Otto the Child. Otto was appointed heir of the allodial property of the Guelphs by his uncle Henry the Elder.

Helena died in 1233 and was buried in the Benedictine monastery of St. Michael in Lüneburg.

Sources

12th-century Danish nobility
12th-century German nobility
Daughters of kings
13th-century German women
Duchesses of Brunswick-Lüneburg
Danish princesses
German princesses
Helena
12th-century births
Year of birth uncertain
1233 deaths
13th-century German nobility